Alan Grenyer (31 August 1892–1953) was an English footballer who played in The Football League for Everton and South Shields. He also played for North Shields Athletic.

References

English footballers
Everton F.C. players
South Shields F.C. (1889) players
English Football League players
1892 births
1953 deaths
North Shields F.C. players
English Football League representative players
Association football wing halves